Luis Danilson Córdoba Rodríguez is a Colombian footballer who plays for Independiente Medellín.

Club career
On 5 January 2010 Nagoya Grampus have signed the Colombian midfielder on loan from Consadole Sapporo until the remainder of the current season. In November 2015, he was released after six seasons in Nagoya.

International career
The left midfielder is member for the Colombia national football team with which he has played three matches this far, against Panama —where Colombia won 4-0—, Mexico and Uruguay.

Career statistics

Club
Updated to 23 February 2017.

1Includes Emperor's Cup.
2Includes J. League Cup.
3Includes AFC Champions League.

International

Statistics accurate as of match played 6 February 2008

Honours

Club
Nagoya Grampus
 J. League Division 1: 1
 2010
 Japanese Super Cup: 1
 2011

Individual
 J. League Best Eleven: 1
 2010

References

External links
 Profile at Avispa Fukuoka
 

1986 births
Living people
People from Quibdó
Colombian footballers
Colombian expatriate footballers
Colombia international footballers
Independiente Medellín footballers
Hokkaido Consadole Sapporo players
Nagoya Grampus players
Avispa Fukuoka players
Expatriate footballers in Japan
Categoría Primera A players
J1 League players
J2 League players
Association football midfielders
Sportspeople from Chocó Department